Sallie Fellows is a New Hampshire politician.

Education
Fellows graduated from Skidmore College with a B.A. in psychology, the University of Massachusetts Amherst with a M.Ed. in education administration, and Southern New Hampshire University with a graduate certificate in school business administration.

Military career
Fellows was a sergeant in the United States Army.

Professional career
On November 6, 2018, Fellows was elected to the New Hampshire House of Representatives where she represents the Grafton 8 district. Fellows assumed office on December 5, 2018. Fellows is a Democrat. Fellows endorses Bernie Sanders in the 2020 Democratic Party presidential primaries.

Personal life
Fellows resides in Holderness, New Hampshire.

References

Living people
People from Holderness, New Hampshire
Skidmore College alumni
University of Massachusetts Amherst College of Education alumni
Southern New Hampshire University alumni
Democratic Party members of the New Hampshire House of Representatives
Female United States Army personnel
Military personnel from New Hampshire
20th-century American women
21st-century American women politicians
21st-century American politicians
Year of birth missing (living people)
United States Army non-commissioned officers